Valsa is a genus of fungi within the family Valsaceae. There are about 70 species in the widespread genus. Anamorphs are classified in the genus Cytospora.

Species
Valsa abietis
Valsa abrupta
Valsa ambiens
Valsa auerswaldii
Valsa ceratophora
Valsa ceratosperma
Valsa ceuthospora
Valsa cypri
Valsa eugeniae
Valsa germanica
Valsa intermedia
Valsa japonica
Valsa kunzei
Valsa laurocerasi
Valsa mali
Valsa nivea
Valsa paulowniae
Valsa pini
Valsa platani
Valsa pustulata
Valsa querna
Valsa salicina
Valsa sordida
Valsa syringae

References

External links

Sordariomycetes genera
Diaporthales